Valentin Ivanovich Pokrovsky (1 April 1929 – 29 October 2020) was a Russian medical scientist, epidemiologist and infectionist.

Career
President of the Russian Academy of Medical Sciences from 1987 to 2006, Academician of the Russian Academy of Sciences (since 2013), Director of the Central Research Institute of Epidemiology under the Ministry of Healthcare of the Russian Federation, Professor at the I.M. Sechenov First Moscow State Medical University, Doctor of Medical Sciences (Dsc).

He was born in RSFSR, Soviet Union, and graduated from the I.M. Sechenov First Moscow State Medical University.

Since 1971 Director of the Central Research Institute of Epidemiology under the Ministry of Healthcare of the Russian Federation.

From 1997 to 2008, Pokrovsky headed the Department of Еpidemiology and Evidence-based medicine at his alma-mater.

Academician of the Russian Academy of Sciences since 2013, Academician of the Russian Academy of Medical Sciences since 1982, Correspondent Member of the Russian Academy of Medical Sciences since 1971.

He was Foreign Member of the National Academy of Sciences of Belarus.

Pokrovsky died on 29 October 2020.

He was awarded:
 Order of Lenin (1986)
 Order of the Red Banner of Labour (1971)

References

External links
 Russian medical volunteers under the First MSMU aegis

2020 deaths
1929 births
Full Members of the Russian Academy of Sciences
Academicians of the Russian Academy of Medical Sciences
Foreign Members of the National Academy of Sciences of Belarus
Recipients of the Order of Lenin
Presidents of the USSR Academy of Medical Sciences